IFF, Iff or iff may refer to:

Arts and entertainment 
 Simon Iff, a fictional character by Aleister Crowley
 Iff of the Unpronounceable Name, a fictional character in the Riddle-Master trilogy by Patricia A. McKillip
 "IFF", an episode of The Expanse

Mathematics, science, and technology 
 Identification friend or foe, an electronic radio-based identification system
 If and only if, a biconditional logical connective between statements, where either both statements are true or both are false
 IFF (software), a series of compositing and visual effects applications (Inferno, Flame and Flint) made by Autodesk Media and Entertainment
 Iff card, a smart card used on bus services in Cardiff, Wales, United Kingdom
 Interchange File Format, a computer file format

Organizations 
 Institute For Figuring, an organization that promotes the public understanding of the poetic and aesthetic dimensions of science, mathematics and the technical arts
International Federation of Factory Workers, former trade union international
 International Flavors & Fragrances, an American corporation which produces flavors and fragrances
 International Freedom Foundation, a self-described anti-communist group established in Washington, D.C.
 Iff Books, an imprint of John Hunt Publishing

Sports organizations 
 International Fencing Federation (Fédération Internationale d'Escrime or FIE), the international governing body for fencing
 International Floorball Federation, the global governing body for the sport of floorball
 Irish Fencing Federation, the governing body for fencing in Ireland

Other uses 
 Illicit financial flows, a concept in economics and finance related to resources that are of illegal origin, use or transfer
 Fakultät für Interdisziplinäre Forschung und Fortbildung (Faculty for Interdisciplinary Research and Continuing Education), a faculty of the Austrian University of Klagenfurt
 Indonesian Film Festival, an annual awards ceremony organised by the Indonesian Film Board to celebrate cinematic achievements in the Indonesian film industry
 International Finance Facility, proposed by HM Treasury in conjunction with the Department for International Development of the United Kingdom
 International freight forwarder, an individual or company that books or otherwise arranges space for shipments between countries via common carriers

See also 
 If (disambiguation)
 IIF (disambiguation)